Major General George Brand Duncan (October 10, 1861 – March 15, 1950) was a United States Army officer who served in numerous conflicts, most notably World War I, where he commanded the 82nd Division, now the 82nd Airborne Division.

Military career
The son of Henry Timberlake Duncan Jr., mayor of Lexington, Kentucky, George Brand Duncan entered the United States Military Academy  (USMA) in 1882, graduating in 1886 and receiving a position as a second lieutenant in the 9th Infantry. Several of his fellow classmates included men who would, like Duncan himself, eventually rise to general officer rank, such as John J. Pershing, Charles T. Menoher, Walter Henry Gordon, Edward Mann Lewis, Mason Patrick, Julius Penn, Avery D. Andrews, John E. McMahon, Ernest Hinds, William H. Hay, James McRae, Lucien Grant Berry and Jesse McI. Carter.

He was stationed in Cuba during the Spanish–American War, and he served with distinction during the Philippine–American War, helping to organize the Philippine Scouts.

After a term on the General Staff, Duncan reported to France in June 1917, two months after the American entry into World War I, where he served as the commander of the 77th Division. After having been relieved over concerns about his physical condition, Duncan successfully convinced John J. Pershing to return him to command. In October 1918, Duncan relieved William P. Burnham as commander of the 82nd Division, and participated in the Meuse-Argonne Offensive. As a result of his service in World War I, he received numerous decorations, including the Croix de Guerre with two palms and a star and status as a Commander in the Legion of Honor from France, status as a Companion of Order of the Bath from the United Kingdom, and the Army Distinguished Service Medal from the United States. The citation for his DSM reads:

Duncan and fellow Major General Campbell King were the first two Americans ever honored with the Croix de Guerre.  Duncan commanded the Seventh Corps Area from 1922 until 1925.

Personal life
Duncan married Mary Kercheval on October 23, 1895. The couple had two sons: Daniel, born in 1901, and Henry, born in 1903. Daniel, however, died as a child in 1906.

Duncan retired from military service in 1925. He is buried in Lexington, Kentucky.

References

External links

|-

|-

1861 births
1950 deaths
Companions of the Order of the Bath
United States Army Infantry Branch personnel
Commandeurs of the Légion d'honneur
Recipients of the Distinguished Service Medal (US Army)
American military personnel of the Spanish–American War
American military personnel of the Philippine–American War
United States Army generals
United States Army generals of World War I
Recipients of the Croix de Guerre 1914–1918 (France)
United States Military Academy alumni
Military personnel from Lexington, Kentucky
Burials in Kentucky